Daeshun Ruffin (born March 26, 2003) is an American college basketball player for the Ole Miss Rebels of the Southeastern Conference (SEC).

High school career
Ruffin played basketball for Callaway High School in Jackson, Mississippi. In his freshman season, he averaged 19.6 points and 5.8 assists per game, and led his team to the semifinals of the 5A state tournament. In his first game at the tournament, Ruffin scored 42 points, breaking Malik Newman's scoring record. Ruffin averaged 26 points, 4.6 rebounds and three assists per game as a sophomore. He averaged 26.8 points, 4.1 rebounds, 3.4 assists and 2.9 steals per game in his junior season, and won a 5A state title. Ruffin was selected as Mississippi Gatorade Player of the Year. As a senior, he averaged 33.1 points, 3.3 rebounds and 2.8 assists per game, and repeated as Mississippi Gatorade Player of the Year. He was named a McDonald's All-American, and received All-State honors in each year of high school.

Recruiting
Ruffin was a consensus four-star recruit and one of the top point guards in the 2021 class. He initially committed to Auburn before reopening his recruitment. On June 17, 2020, Ruffin committed to Ole Miss over offers from Auburn, Florida, Mississippi State and LSU, among others. He became the highest-ranked recruit in program history.

College career
Ruffin suffered a broken hand in his college debut against New Orleans on November 9, 2021. He made his return on December 15 during a 62–52 win over Middle Tennessee State, scoring 12 points in 13 minutes. He recorded a team-high 19 points off the bench in their next game, a 76–68 victory over Dayton. Ruffin scored 19 points during a 76–72 win over LSU on February 1, 2022, but suffered a season-ending knee injury. He averaged 12.6 points, 3.4 assists and a team-high 2.3 steals per game.

Career statistics

College

|-
| style="text-align:left;"| 2021–22
| style="text-align:left;"| Ole Miss
| 14 || 10 || 25.9 || .373 || .216 || .754 || 1.5 || 3.4 || 2.3 || .1 || 12.6

References

External links
Ole Miss Rebels bio

2003 births
Living people
American men's basketball players
Basketball players from Jackson, Mississippi
McDonald's High School All-Americans
Ole Miss Rebels men's basketball players
Point guards